The men's singles tournament of the 2017 BWF World Championships (World Badminton Championships) took place from 21 to 27 August.

Seeds

  Son Wan-ho (semifinals)
  Lee Chong Wei (first round)
  Viktor Axelsen (champion)
  Shi Yuqi (third round)
  Chen Long (semifinals)
  Chou Tien-chen (quarterfinals)
  Lin Dan (final)
  Srikanth Kidambi (quarterfinals)

  Ng Ka Long Angus (third round)
  Tian Houwei (quarterfinals)
  Tanongsak Saensomboonsuk (third round)
  Wong Wing Ki (quarterfinals)
  Ajay Jayaram (third round)
  Anders Antonsen (third round)
  B. Sai Praneeth (third round)
  Rajiv Ouseph (third round)

Draw

Finals

Section 1

Section 2

Section 3

Section 4

References
Draw

2017 BWF World Championships